The Girona Open was a golf tournament on the European Tour in 1991. It was held at Golf Platja de Pals in Girona, Catalonia, Spain, and was won by England's Steven Richardson.

Winners

External links
Coverage on the European Tour's official site

Former European Tour events
Golf tournaments in Catalonia